Headlong may refer to:
 Headlong (theatre company), a British theatre company
 Headlong (Williams novel), a 1980 novel by Emlyn Williams
 Headlong (Frayn novel), a 1999 novel by Michael Frayn
 Headlong (Ings novel), a 1999 novel by Simon Ings
 "Headlong" (song), a song by Queen from Innuendo
 "Headlong", a song by IQ from The Wake